The 2010 All-Ireland Senior Camogie Championship—known as the Gala All-Ireland Senior Camogie Championship for sponsorship reasons—is the high point of the 2010 season in the sport of camogie. It commenced on June 13, 2010 and ended with the final between Galway and Wexford on 12 September 2010 which Wexford won by 1-12 to 1-10. Seven teams compete in the Senior Championship out of twenty-seven who competed overall in the Senior, Intermediate and Junior Championships.

Structure 
The seven teams played one another once, and receive 2 points for a win, 1 point for a draw. The top four teams then contested the semi-finals, in which both 2009 finalists were defeated, defending champions Cork by Galway by one point in a replay and 2009 finalists Kilkenny by National Camogie League 2010 champions Wexford.

Finals 
For the first time since 2006 the finals did not share a billing with the All-Ireland Under 21 Hurling Championship. Instead the All Ireland Senior, Intermediate, and Junior championship finals were held on the same day.

Galway Anomaly
When Galway beat Wexford 1-8 to 0-10 in the group stages only to lose the final 1-12 to 1-10, it was the third time in the five years since the championship moved from a knockout system to a round-robin format in 2006 that the runners-up defeated the eventual champions in the group stages.

Fixtures

Group stage

Cross table

Table

Final stages

MATCH RULES
60 minutes
Replay if scores level
Maximum of 5 substitutions

Gala Performance awards 2010

 Gemma O'Connor Cork
 Brenda Hanney Galway
 Anna Geary Cork
 Aoife O'Connor Cork

Gala All-Ireland Final Player of the Match

 Katrina Parrock Wexford

Championship statistics

Scoring

 Championship including final stage
 Top Scorer
Aislinn Connolly Galway 6-58
Widest winning margin: 43 points
Wexford 7-15 : 0-3 Dublin
Most goals in a match: 7
Wexford 7-15 : 0-3 Dublin
Most points in a match: 31
Cork 1-16 : 1-15 Tipperary
Wexford 2-17 : 0-14 Tipperary
Most goals by one team in a match: 7
Wexford 7-15 : 0-3 Dublin
Most points by one team in a match: 23
Cork 1-23 : 1-6 Dublin

References

External links
 Official match programme for 2010 All Ireland camogie final
 Camogie Association

2010
2010
All-Ireland Senior Camogie Championship